The following is a list of characters from the Hong Kong drama television series A Kindred Spirit.

Lee Family (Main Family)

Core Family Members

Bing 炳 (Full name Lee Biu Bing 李標炳, often called Char Siu Bing 叉燒炳 by his family members. Played by Lau Dan)- The head of the family who operates the restaurant and makes Chinese BBQ food for a living. Bing's parents died at a young age and he had to take care of his sister Choi Yiu by working as an apprentice Chinese BBQ shop butcher.
Auntie Shin 善姨 (Full name Leung Yun Shin 梁潤善. Played by Louise Lee)- Wife of Bing. A typical housemaker who took care of her children carefully and fed them for many years. Auntie Shin is often the voice of reason and is the confidant of several characters in the series.
Grandma Ga or Ah Ga 阿家 (Full name Yuen Man Guen 阮文娟. Played by Lai Suen)- Auntie Shin's mother, known for her feistiness and hard-to-get-along characteristics.
Leung Yao 梁　友 (Played by Kwan Hoi-san)- Long lost husband of Grandma Ga, who ran away to Vietnam long ago and was eventually reunited with his wife. He had an affair with a Vietnamese woman during the time he was away from his father. He secretly has a son.
 Yun Choi 'Kao Fu - Uncle' 潤才 or Ah Choi 阿 才 (Full name Leung Yun Choi 梁潤才). Played by Billy Lau- Leung Yao and Grandma Ga's son, Auntie Shin and Auntie Ho's brother, who has a shop selling watches and clocks in Canada. He has a wife who is half-Caucasian, and a rebellious teenage daughter Wai-wai. He went back to Canada with his family after Dai Ma and her husband left the show.
Ah Yu 'Kum Mo - Aunt' 阿瑜(Full name Ma Yoke Yu 馬玉瑜) Ah Choi's wife who comes from a rich, upper-class family in Canada. Outspoken and direct, she has no qualms about voicing her frank opinions that frequently engages her mother-in-law Grandma Ga in verbal arguments. She also frequently nags at Ah Choi, causing Ah Choi to be rather frustrated with their marriage. Devastated by Ah Choi's infidelity, she nearly filed for divorce. Fortunately, she found out that she was pregnant with a male son that the family and Ah Choi had long been yearning for, and that led to her finally forgiving Ah Choi.
Ah Fuk 阿 福 (Full name Lee Tim Fuk 李添福. Played by Ram Chiang)- Son of Bing and Auntie Shin. He is the only uneducated son in the family due to a lack of financial resources, and this has made Auntie Shin and Bing feel guilty from time to time. He helps out his parents in their restaurant. His wife Wing Kum is highly protective of him and their son, Lok Lok. His gullibility has led him into troubles in the series from time to time, including marrying his second wife (a scheming woman from the mainland) after Wing Kum died.
Wing Kum 詠琴 or Ah Kum 阿 琴 (Full name Chan Wing Kum 陳詠琴. Played by Louisa So)- The daughter-in-law of the Lee family. Wing works at a spa and is sometimes giving facials. She died after donating her liver to her son Lok Lok. Her death was an extremely tragic arc in the show, even more so than Choi Yiu's death.
Lok Lok 樂樂 (Full name Lee Zhi Lok 李子樂. Played by Luis Oh) - Talented son of Fuk and Wing Kum. Grandson of Bing and Auntie Shin. He is very enthusiastic towards his education. He knows that his parents work really hard and try to support him in the education field, and hope he gets into a high well known famous school. In the later episodes, he was discovered of having liver problems.
See Kum 思琴 played by Fiona Yuen - The second wife of Fuk after Wing Kum's death. She is an evil woman who only likes Fuk because of his money. She pretends to be innocent in front of the family until later on when Auntie Shin finds out she was involved in the kidnapping of Lok Lok. Initially only intent on gaining the Lee family's wealth as their daughter-in-law, she eventually falls in love with Ah Fook. When Ah Jing discovers her schemes, and that See Kum and her "brother" Ah Fatt are really lovers, Ah Fatt hits Ah Jing on her head with a brick, sending her into a coma. Unable to save Ah Jing, See Kum is plagued with guilt until she is exposed in the end. She leaves the family in shame and reappears in the finale as a pregnant wife of a rich Mainland businessman.
Sei Ma 細孖  or Ah Yan 阿欣 (literally the little twin, full name Lee Daw Yun 李多欣. Played by Florence Kwok) - One of the two twin daughters of Bing and Shin. She holds a high position at a bank, and is married to a wealthy businessman who went broke in the early part of the series. She is also a mother of a young daughter, Puet Puet. She is sometimes a bit demanding, although she is well liked by all the members of the family. (As contrasted with her twin sister, whom Bing dislikes.) She had problems with her "Upper-class Mother-in-law" and sister-in-law at the beginning of the series, especially when she was on the verge of having a divorce with Ching Wah.
Ching Wah 清華 (Played by Law Siu Kwan)- The husband of Sei Ma. He is a philandering wealthy businessman who was victimized by a business partner jealous of his marriage to Sei Ma. He went broke as a result, but managed to salvage his broken marriage with Sei Ma. He set up a business with Hoi after his bankruptcy, and returned to wealth.
Dai Ma (Joyce) 大孖  or Ah Foon 阿歡 (literally the elder twin, full name Lee Daw Foon 李多歡. Played by Kenix Kwok) - The other twin daughter of Bing and Shin whom Sei Ma is intensely jealous of. Outraged by her parents for sending her cousin Lup Sung overseas to study instead of herself when they were young, her fiercely independent nature led her to leave the family years ago to pursue her own studies for seven years in the US. Bing therefore disapproves of her actions. Upon returning to HK, she worked in a fashion company, where she was involved in a secret relationship with her boss (acted by Joe Ma), until it was revealed that her boss was already married. She then moved on to another fashion company where she worked under Helen with her brother On Jai. She left early in the series, after marrying an ex-policeman Ah Bong and migrating to the UK. She is remembered for her stubbornness (some would call it determination).
Bong 阿邦 (Full name Fung Chun Bong 馮振邦. Played by Sunny Chan)- Dai Ma's husband, who is an ex-policeman. He is a helpful man who helps the Lee family many times in his early appearances, whom Dai Ma initially disliked. Later on they fall in love, but he is unable to be with Dai Ma because he of an old life-threatening injury. (Also because he is divorced with a daughter.) After going for a heart operation, he finally marries Dai Ma, and they migrated to the UK.
On Jai 安仔 (Andy) (Full name Lee Tim On 李添安. Played by Hawick Lau)- The youngest son of Bing and Shin, he is a college grad who works in the same company as his sister Dai Ma. His good looks often gets him into a lot of love entanglements. His love affair with Joan, the sister of his boss stretches through the entire series. He gets involved in a love triangle with Joan and a spiteful girl Joon Joon at the end of the series, before finally marrying Joan in the finale. (His dad in the show is actually his dad in real life.)
Choi Yiu 彩瑤 (Full name Lee Choi Yiu 李彩瑤. Played by Angie Cheung) - Bing's younger sister; first wife of Ah Hoi. She has a close and affectionate bond with her niece Dai Ma, who is of a very similar temperament. Initially a wild and irresponsible unmarried mother, she had an ambiguous relationship with Ah Hoi, who had been in love with her since they were young. She left HK in the early part of the series to seek help in curing her Stomach Cancer, without informing the family of her whereabouts. Upon returning, Hoi, thinking Choi Yiu was dead, was in a relationship with Auntie Ho's daughter Seung-Seung. She married Hoi eventually, and changed into a loving and caring wife and mother, but died during a bandit attack in Mainland China. Hoi takes care of Choi Yiu's young daughter Ah Gwan after Choi Yiu's death. She was the first major character to die in the series, and her death was shocking and unexpected, since at that point she had already fully recovered from cancer.
Hoi 海 or Ah Hoi 阿海 (Full name Yung Heung Hoi 容向海. Played by Ben Wong)- Adopted son of Auntie Yung. His biological mother, from whom he was separated from during a big fire in the city slum, is the widow of a wealthy Malaysian Chinese tycoon. Hoi works at Sum Dor selling Char Siew since he was young, but eventually forms a construction material company together with Sei Ma's husband Ah Wah, thus becoming a successful businessman. Hoi is the major focus of the series at many different points. His four relationships with Choi Yiu, Seung Seung, Ah Gwai, and Go Nga Man are full of drama and climaxes.
Auntie Yung 容姨 (Full name Yung Mu 容　妹. Played by Sin-hung Tam)- She has served the family, in particular Grandma Ga, for decades. The Lee family treats her as if she is a part of the family. She gets more focus as the series progresses, especially when she finds her two long-lost children, Ah Keng and Ji Ho.
Gwai 貴 Ah Gwai 阿貴 (Full name Ng Fong Gwai 吳芳貴. Played by Angie Cheung)- The second wife of Hoi, who looks exactly the same as Choi Yiu (in fact, the two characters were played by the same actress, who needed a break from the show during its production). She became Bing's god-sister, before marrying Hoi. Her questionable (some say downright lacking) ethics have brought her into various disputes throughout the series. She was previously romantically linked with Ah Nam.
Keng 阿瓊 (Full name Yu Keng 俞瓊. Played by Kingdom Yuen)- Auntie Yung's long-lost daughter, who eventually married the eldest son of Datuk Gui. Her mental capacity was impaired after a serious illness in her youth, leading her to be called "Idiot Keng" as a running gag. Keng and Gwai were brought up by the same foster mother.
Vietnamese 越南 (Full name Leung Ga Ming 梁家明. Played by Kenny Wong) - Leung Yao's long-lost illegitimate son from Vietnam. Sensible and hardworking, he resembles Auntie Shin in character more than his half brother Yuen Choi and half sister Auntie Ho. He appears at the end of the series to acknowledge Leung Yao as his father, and has a turbulent relationship with an intelligent and pretty doctor, Chiu, who is the elder sister of Joon Joon.

Relatives and other members

Lau family (upper class in-laws)

The Upper Class In-Law 上等親家 (Full name Leung Seung Yin 梁尚燕. Played by Gung Yu)- Ching Hwa's mother. Although her real name is Leung Seung Yin, she is widely remembered in the series as the upper-class person because of her initial discriminatory view towards less wealthy persons, in addition to commoner cultures and customs that she considered as "undesirable" for her and her aristocratic cabals. The attitudes, however, somewhat subsided after the family went broke.
Ching Wun 劉清芸- Rich, initially snobbish, and highly educated, Ching Wun's love for Dai Sing was strong enough for her to decide to leave her upper-class life behind to marry Dai Sing, who couldn't provide much for her and their two children. She had to work in Sei Ma's bank as a teller eventually to support her own family, after having spent her whole life living off her rich Upper-Class Mother and brother Ching Hwa. She and Dai Sing would provide much comic relief sporadically throughout the series.
Dai Sing (Full name Chan Dai Sing 陳大勝. Played by Johnny Ngan) - Elder brother of Wing Kum, who did some time in prison for a crime that he wasn't guilty of before he appears on the show. He has since operated a tea stand in the restaurant. He is best remembered for his marriage (And turbulent married life) to Upper-class In-law's highly educated and feisty daughter, Ching Wun. Dai Sing and Ching Wun have a son and a daughter.
Melvin 梁尚人 - The Upper Class In-Law's younger brother would return from Canada a few years after his wife, Becky, runs away with all his money. Melvin is a photographer and later gets a job as a fashion photographer at Helen's clothing company and works with On Jai. At first Melvin and Auntie Ho do not get along, but the two later have a brief romance. Auntie Ho calls Melvin "mao see".
Sharon 梁冰雪 (Played by Joyce Tang) -  Sharon, who is Melvin's daughter, was blinded during childhood and is able to regain her sight after Auntie Ho's son, Lap Sang, performs eye surgery on Sharon. She therefore falls in love with Lap Sung and marries her, but the marriage was extremely ill-fated and ended up with the death of Rebecca, Sharon's miscarriage and loss of memory, and Lap Sung becoming a cripple. She gets her happy ending eventually though, after regaining her memories, and ends up with a promising young student back in New York (US) named Samson, who is a medical student.

Auntie Ho family

Auntie Ho 好姨(Full name Leung Yun Ho 梁潤好. Played by Nancy Sit)- Leung Yao and Grandma Ga's younger daughter and sister of Auntie Shin and Yuen Choi. She was sold by her parents to an old Mainland Chinese while they were in financial trouble a long time ago. Auntie Ho, therefore, bears a significant grudge against her parents and resent them for neglecting her when she was younger in favour of Shin and Choi (this eventually subsided though). She is quite feisty and works in many different occupations. Her love interests include Melvin, aka "mao see" (literally cat poop) (Upper Class in law's younger brother), Biu-Lang-Hon (Bing's elder brother), and a doctor, Shan Qing, whose characteristics is not very different from Seymour Skinner on US Cartoon Series The Simpsons.
Lap Sang 立生 (Full name Tong Lap Sang 唐立生. Played by Marco Lo)- The most educated person in the family and is the son of Auntie Ho and her long-lost lover (who is a scammer). This biological father of his tried to expose his true identity as a son born out of wedlock but failed. When Lap Sang returns from medical school in the UK, he is romantically linked to Rebecca (often called "Banana" by Auntie Ho). Eventually, Lap Sang marries Melvin's daughter, Sharon, after Sharon gets pregnant. Rebecca is twisted and jealous and sets up to ruin Lap Sang and Suet. He is a doctor who eventually was convicted of kidnapping and served time in prison. Since that time, he went through a transformation and rehabilitated his reputation. He is remembered for his romance with a social worker, whose trials and tribulations was portrayed right up to the end of the series. This social worker, Jing, became his second wife.
Ah Jing 阿靜 (Full name Lam Jing Chuen 林靜川. Played by Wallis Pang)- A pretty social worker who has a slightly turbulent courtship with Lap Sung. She eventually becomes pregnant with his baby. During her pregnancy, she is beaten into a coma by the lover of Fuk's scheming second wife, who married Fuk only because she was after the family's money. Jing eventually woke up from her coma and became Lap Sung's second wife. (His first wife was Upper-class In-law's niece, Sharon)
Seung Seung 雙雙 (Full name Tong Lai Seung 唐麗雙. Played by Candy Law Lum)- Half-sister of Lap Sung. She is the daughter of Auntie Ho and her husband, a rich doctor. Once sold into an arranged marriage by Auntie Ho, Seung Seung's first love was Hoi, even though Hoi had already been courting Choi Yiu for many years while they were growing up in the Lee family. Hoi, however, never took a chance with her, and Seung Seung eventually married Kwok Qiu, an elderly doctor, and left for the US.   Seung Seung and Hoi had a baby, whom she cannot bring herself to acknowledge. Hoi and Choi Yiu, and later Gwai after Choi Yiu's death, would take care of this child, treating him like their own.
Principal In-law 校長親家 The hard-to-get-along, highly principled without being nasty or unreasonable retired principal who eventually became Auntie Ho's mother-in-law. Grandma hates her because of how she refused to allow Auntie Shin to date Principal Gao's son Shan Ching many years ago while they were neighbours.
Shan Ching 高山青 Auntie Ho's husband. Old and unmarried; very afraid and controlled by his own mother Principal Gao, he eventually falls in love with Auntie Ho after a long period of time where they would tease and squabble with each other. It took a long time for Principal Gao to finally allow him to marry Auntie Ho, and it is ironic because of what happened in the past with Auntie Shin and Grandma.
Ah Mun 高雅文 (Played by Cally Kwong鄺美雲) Shan Tseng's stepsister. A very capable businesswoman with business dealings with Hoi and Ching Hwa. She got into a breakdown after finding out that her boyfriend was gay, and that her real mother wasn't Principal Gao, but someone else who died many years ago. She finds solace with Hoi, who was having serious problems with his marriage to Gwai at that time. In the grand tradition of the show, she leaves HK for a better life, thus making an exit from the messy love triangle and the show.

Dai-Bak (Elder Uncle)'s family members
Biu Lang Han 大伯 (Nickname. Real name Lee Biu Han 李標漢. Played by Kenneth Tsang)- Stepbrother of Bing and Choi Yiu. He came to Hong Kong from the Mainland in the middle of the show, and brought along three grown-up children. He had a major misunderstanding with Bing and Choi Yiu years ago when Bing and Choi Yiu's father left them and their mother for Biu Han's mother, but the issue was eventually resolved. Biu Han had a short romance with Auntie Ho, but left HK after he realised that Auntie Ho's true love was not him, but Melvin.
Ji Ho 子浩 (Full name Lee Ji Ho 李子浩. Played by Chang Tse Sheng)- The most memorable villain of the story. He came to Hong Kong along with Biu Lang Han, but he is the biological son of Auntie Yung. Greed drove him to commit unthinkable deeds including kidnapping and murder, even the destruction of his own family. Ji Ho's death at the hands of the police was one of the most celebrated events in the show's long history, and was well remembered by many people. This character is so successful that the actor who played this character has never played a protagonist in any movies or drama shows ever since Ji Ho's much celebrated death.
Siu Mui 小梅 (Full name Lee Siu Mui 李小梅. Played by Lam Yi Kei)- The sister of Ji Ho. Siu Mui is somewhat the personification of Mainlander Chinese stereotypes in Hong Kong at the time: old-fashioned, poor fashion tastes, speaks Cantonese with an accent, and lives with a housewife mentality. Aunt Ho helps Siu Mui speak better Cantonese after several other people make fun of Siu Mui's accent. Siu Mui was eventually attached to a chauvinistic Martial Arts mentor Mok Chuen.
Mok Chuen 木川 (Full name Lam Mok Chuen 林木川.)- Siu Mui's chauvinistic boyfriend. Ah Jing's estranged elder brother, childhood neighbour of Dai Sing and Wing Kum.
Dai Lik 大力 (Full name Lee Ji Lik 李子力. Nickname Tai Lik ("Strong") Played by Wai Ga Hung)- The little brother of Ji Ho. He is a rather nerdy character, and had a minor role in the show, besides having a brief ambiguous relationship with Keng while Keng's true love Loi was away. After Ji Ho's death, Ji Lik went to Shanghai to start a business and transformed into a successful and confident businessman.

Datuk Gui Family
 Datuk Gui  (Played by Chor Yuan 楚　原) An elderly authoritarian and nasty figure from a rich Malaysian family, he ends up being very acquainted with the Lee family whom he used to consider low class when his children get romantically involved with the people from the Lee family. He has three wives, the first, Wai Fung, an understanding and supportive woman, mother of Ya Loi, the second the understanding, elegant and compassionate mother of Ya Num, the other, the much younger (sometimes referred to as his mistress), initially wild and flamboyant mother of May May, Sophie. His greatest regrets in live were never forgiving Sophie until the last point and having an affair with another woman while married to his first wife, Wai Fung. He reveals that he would like to be buried in Hong Kong, next to his first wife. His favorite foods are lobster and mango and these would be his offering on his tombstone.
Mrs. Datuk 拿督大夫人 (Played by Tsang Yuk-Guen 曾玉娟. Full name Ho Wai Fung, as revealed in Eps. 943.) Mother of Ya Loi and first wife of Datuk Gui. She married Datuk Gui before he had his own business. She was understanding and dutiful wife  When Datuk Gui's family business started to fail, she encouraged him to go out and start a business of his own and that she would take care of the family for him. When he came back, she was pregnant with his son. Datuk Gui had an affair with a dancer. Even though she knew of the affair, she said nothing about it. It was not until the woman came to her that she left Malaysia, still pregnant. She took nothing with her. She went to Hong Kong and it was there that she gave birth to Ya Loi. She died soon after as Datuk Gui found her in the hospital. She never forgave him and her dying wishes was to be buried in Hong Kong rather Malaysia, as a symbol that she never wish to follow him home. Datuk Gui never forgave himself, and it remain his greatest guilt. Datuk Gui's main reason for loving Sophie may have been her resemblance toward Wai Fung, as guessed by May May. She also resembled her daughter-in-law, Keng. His only memorabilia of hers is her photos and a pearl necklace, his first gift to her. Datuk Gui's affair is similar to Ya Loi's affair with Ivy during the early part of his marriage to Keng. Her favorite foods were fresh milk and flaky pastry and these are the offerings on her tombstone.
Mrs. Datuk  拿督二夫人 (Played by  Leung Biu-Ching 梁葆貞. Full name See To Ju 司徒珠) Second wife of Datuk Gui, biological mother of Ya Num and stepmother of Ya Loi.  She treats Ya Loi better than her own son due to her effort not to become an evil stepmother. Even though she disliked Sophie at first, she showed no spite toward her or her daughter, May May, and she even try reuniting her and Datuk Gui. Her signature is a picture of a pig because of the Ju in her name. She is heiress to 10% of Datuk Gui's fortune
Sophie 蘇菲 Upper Class In-law and Melvin's younger cousin. The mother of the obnoxious May May, and the third wife of the rich and nasty Datuk Gui. May May and her were chased out of Datuk Gui's family when Datuk Gui found out that May May wasn't his own biological daughter. Years later, just when Datuk Gui was finally going to forgive her, she gets involved in a horrible car accident that killed her right before she could reunite with Datuk Gui.
Ya Loi (Full name Gui Ya Loi 歸亞萊. Played by David Lui 呂　方) The eldest son of Datuk Gui. Romantic and irreverent, with a flair for music, he has an extremely turbulent relationship with Keng when he first meets her after running away to HK to avoid marrying someone his father arranged for. After nearly being killed by Keng's evil brother Ji Ho, he leaves HK and Malaysia to Vienna, where he spent years recovering from his emotional wounds with Keng until the end of the series, where he eventually returns and marries Keng. He had a supposed girlfriend named Ling Ling who was his real live girlfriend. He is heir to 50% of Datuk Gui's fortune
Ya Num (Full name Gui Ya Num 歸亞南. Played by Mark Kwok 郭耀明.) The second son of Datuk Gui. Half brother of Ya Loi. Handsome, smart, capable, he is the perfect man for many. He gets into a love triangle with Hoi and Gwai while working in HK, but Gwai dumped him on the day of their wedding and chose to marry Hoi instead. Ya Num gets his happy ending with the sweet and lovely Ah Muen, who happens to be Ji Ho's ex-girlfriend. He is heir to 30% of Datuk Gui's fortune.
Ah Muen 石敏 (Played By Winnie Yeung)- She's JI HO's ex-girlfriend but eventually married AH LAM. When JI HO kidnaps her, Ah Muen gives birth to a baby boy.
Yat Jai 一 仔  (Full name Gui Yat  歸 一.) The only son of Ya Num and Ah Muen.  He is the second grandson of Datuk Gui, after Gui Dan.
Dan Dan  旦 旦  (Full name Gui Dan 歸旦.) Son of May May and Ji Ho, he is the eldest grandson of Datuk Gui.  Her mother named him Gui Dan (similar in sounds to Tortoise Egg or idiot in Cantonese) instead of Lee Dan or Yung Dan, as it would be after his father Ji Ho or his grandmother Auntie Yung.  His father shows no affection for him other than the last moments before his death, but even then his feelings were questionable.  A fortune teller says that he would grow up to be a responsible child and May May can count on him to raise her in old age.  He is heir to 9% of Datuk Gui's fortune.
May May- (Full name Gui Ya May 歸亞美. Played by Celine Ma Tai Lo 馬蹄露.)  Spoilt rich daughter of another Malaysian Chinese Tycoon, Datuk Gui, May May turned out to be the illegitimate daughter of Datuk Gui's third wife Sophie and another businessman. Best known for her marriage to the main villain of the story, Ji Ho. She became Auntie Yung's unreasonably demanding daughter-in-law. Her feistiness is paralleled only by that of Grandma Ga. She strongly believes she is a great beauty and elegant person even though it is far from the truth.  Ji Ho later gets a mistress and dumps May May just before Datuk Gui learns that May May is not his daughter. May May tries unsuccessfully to commit suicide (foiled by a pile of garbage bags) during a month birthday of her son, Dan Dan. Datuk Gui eventually excepted her into the family again after Sophie's death.  She meets her match eventually with Chiu and Joon Joon's brother, the eccentric (and equally feisty) Law Sun Moon. She is heir to 1% of Datuk Gui's fortune.

Law family

Secretary Law 羅秘書 (Played by Chiu Shek Man 招石文.) He is the most trusted and probably only true friend of Datuk Gui.  He once served in Datuk Gui's army.  He now serve as Secretary, chauffeur, and anything the Gui family might want him to do.  He sometimes gives advice to Datuk Gui, and he is probably the man who knows the real Datuk Gui under his skin.  He has a family of his own.  His nephew and nieces would later enter the story.
Law Tien Zhuang  羅天莊- (Played by Lee Gong 李　岡.)  Secretary Law's elder brother and father of Zhao, Simon, and Joon Joon.
Fong Siu Lay  范小妮- (Played by Ma Ching-Yee 馬清儀.)  Wife of Tien Zhuang and mother of Zhao, Simon, and Joon Joon.
 Zhao or Doctor Law- (Full name Law San Zhao 羅生肖. Played by Melissa Ng 吳美珩.) Eldest sister of Simon and Joon Joon.  She was a pregnancy doctor and personally helped Lap Sang and Jing's son come to life.  She is very serious and very unsocial.  She never had friends until she met the Lee Family.  At the beginning, there was a confusion of a relation between her in Lap Sang.  Her only love as of then was Ken, who she had met in college in London.  During their first Christmas, she went over to his college dorm and found that he was secretly going out with another girl.  Ken had used the $100,000 from the account they shared, and the next day he ran away.  She never forgot about him, carried an old Christmas card he had given her and constantly smoke cigarettes (a habit taught by him) when she became unhappy.  Ken, who was cousin of Dai Ma's husband Bong, came back to Hong Kong with his pregnant wife Candy.  Zhao delivered the son of Candy and Ken.  He tried getting Zhao back, but Ken only loved his woman for their money; and Zhao, as a doctor, had a salary of thousands of dollar. She would end up with Leung Ga Ming, the son of Leung Yao and his Vietnamese mistress.
Simon- (Full name Law San Moon 羅生門. Played by Michael Tse 謝天華.)  Brother of Joon Joon and Zhao.  He was born on the same year, date, hour and hospital as Yah Loi.  After he was born Secretary Law carried him and Yah Loi, one on each of his hands.  From this point on, he has always believed he was the real son of Datuk Gui.  This belief was later disproven.  He is the exact mirror image of May May.  He believed he is the most handsomest and lucky man in world and that he would one day be rich. He and May May constantly fight, but gets along well with Dan Dan.  He originally worked in a very low position at Datuk Gui's company, but after an attempt of sabotage by May May to get him fired, he became May May's personal servant and Dan Dan's babysitter. He attempted to marry Zhu Yao, the obese daughter of Zhu Datuk. He had started changing his mind when May May again sabotaged his plans.  He eventually ended up with May May.
Joon Joon 津津- (Full name Law San Joon 羅生津. Played by Miss Hong Kong 1998 finalist, Fiona Leung 梁珮盈.)  Youngest sister of Zhao and Simon. She is fun loving and constantly talks on the phone.  She became a model at Helen's Company, after she stole Joan's picture from On Jai, who promised to get her a job as a model if she returned it.  She begins to date with An Jai.  After Joan's return a triangle relation developed and she eventually broke up with On Jai.

Other characters
Edmund Lau (Played by Joe Ma.)  Dai Ma's first boyfriend; he went out with her while still married to his wife.
Miss Chan (Judy) (Played by Ng Wing Hung.)  Edmund's wife and Lok Lok's school teacher.
Candy (Played by Lam Pui Gwun 林佩君, not the same Lam Pui Gwun from A Virtue of Harmony.)  She is Ken's wife.  Ken only married Candy because of her father had a string of stores in England that made the family quite rich.  After this marriage the family business went bad and one store remain.  When she came to Hong Kong, she was seven months pregnant, and had to be sent to the hospital after being bumped by a dim sum waitress.  She gave birth to a baby boy.  She was smart enough to know that her husband did not love her or their baby and that he was not true to her.  Her main goal in coming back to Hong Kong was to inherit some money from a relative.  She unknowingly helped her husband in a plot to steal Zhao's money.  When she questioned Ken about his recent activity with Zhao, he told her he was chasing after a $500,000 debt that Zhao had borrow from him.  She believed it and went after Zhao, asking her to return the money.  Ken told Zhao another lie that Candy had a post-pregnancy mental illness in which she went around saying people owed her money.  Feeling sorry for this Zhao lent the money to Ken.  She found out about her husband's tricks few days before returning to England and went to ask Zhao what happen between Ken and her. That when she and Zhao found out that they were both being used.  She demand divorce before returning to England, saying that this trip to Hong Kong had reveal to her who he really was.  Ka Tung remained with her.
Ken or Kenny - (Full name Lam Bo Gin 林寶堅. Played by Marco Ngai 魏駿傑.) Former boyfriend of Zhao and cousin of Bong, Dai Ma's husband.  He lives in England and rarely goes to Hong Kong.  He went to Hong Kong along with his wife, Candy, to gain some inheritance.  He is a playboy, who thinks life is all about spend money, playing, gambling, and eating.  He blames everybody around him for his actions even his wife. He tried to scheme $500,000 from Zhao by acting like he changed (by giving her flowers, waiting at a restaurant for her, and giving her a check of $10,000 that he had previously taken from her) and tricking his own wife into helping him.  Before he left, he stole Auntie Yung's and Grandma Ga's jewelry.  He was tricked into riding a taxi where Dai Sing was the driver and beaten by the entire Lee and Law family.  It turn out that Zhao had already canceled the check she had given him.
Ka Tung - (Full name Lam Ka Tung 林家棟. Played by 江尚桐.)  Candy and Ken's baby son.  He was only 7 months old when Doctor Law delivered him. According to Doctor Law he was pretty heavy for being born so early.  His name came from a Christmas card to Zhao, a.k.a. Doctor Law, who Ken wrote that they would name their son Lam Ka Tung 林家棟 for. Ken chose out of a plot to swindle Zhao's money, rather than for love toward her.
Helen- Director of a clothing company that Dai Ma and her little brother works in. Her sister, Joan, is entangled in a love affair with Dai Ma's little brother, On Jai. Helen works very hard to build her business and raise Joan. Helen and Keng work together to get money back from a con artist nicknamed Tea Leave Egg or Charles.
Joan- Girlfriend of On Jai. Their on again, off again relationship is very rocky, and Joan did date a wealthy Thai Chinese businessman during the series as they got into frequent contacts due to his business dealings with Helen in Thailand. The businessman eventually fell in love with her elder sister, Helen. That created another set of comical problems towards the end of the series
Guy Kwan 雞坤 - Owner of the poultry store that supplies the restaurant with chickens. Guy Kwan is a friend of Fuk and Dai Sing and has a crush on Keng. He also has a gambling addiction and often gets in trouble with loan sharks.
Ha Foo Cho, Leung Cha Paw - She is known as the lady that sells Chinese tea. Her store is right across from the roast pork restaurant. She is old and quiet. Sometimes she drops by the roast pork restaurant and buys roast pork.
Lai Gin Long (Played By Felix Lok)- May May's birth father.  He is an evil and selfish man who doesn't care about anyone else besides himself, even Sophie and May May is nothing to him.  He blackmailed Sohpie that if she didn't give him money, he'll tell Datuk Gui about May May's true paternity.  He cheated on his wife, but his wife was, also, cheating on him.  He becomes interested in Joan, On Jai's girlfriend, and she, momentarily blinded by greed for money, became attracted to him. It was later explained that she was momentarily blinded by greed for money and that she found a mature man provided a feeling of security to her; thus acted irrationally.  After a divorce, he went broke.  He tried tricking May May into marrying a rich man, who found pleasure in brutally beating his women.

Kindred Spirit
Kindred Spirit